The Big Sioux River is a tributary of the Missouri River in eastern South Dakota and northwestern Iowa in the United States. The United States Board on Geographic Names settled on "Big Sioux River" as the stream's name in 1931. The river was named after the Lakota people (Sioux Natives) which was known by them as Tehankasandata, or Thick Wooded River.

The Big Sioux River rises in Roberts County, South Dakota on a low plateau known as the Coteau des Prairies and flows generally southwardly through Grant, Codington, Hamlin, Brookings, Moody, and Minnehaha counties, past the communities of Watertown, Castlewood, Bruce, Flandreau, Egan, Trent, Dell Rapids, and Baltic to Sioux Falls, where it passes over a waterfall in Falls Park, which gives that city its name.  Downstream of Sioux Falls and the community of Brandon, the Big Sioux defines the boundary between South Dakota and Iowa, flowing along the eastern borders of Lincoln and Union counties in South Dakota, and the western borders of Lyon, Sioux and Plymouth counties in Iowa, past the communities of Canton, Fairview, Hudson, Hawarden, North Sioux City, and Dakota Dunes in South Dakota and Beloit, Hawarden and Akron in Iowa.  It joins the Missouri River from the north at Sioux City, Iowa.

 
The Big Sioux River, at the USGS station in Sioux City, Iowa, has a mean annual discharge of approximately 3,793 cubic feet per second.

Tributaries
The Big Sioux River collects the Rock River from the northeast in Sioux County, Iowa.  A minor headwaters tributary of the Big Sioux in Grant County, South Dakota, is known as the Indian River. Broken Kettle Creek has its confluence with the Big Sioux in Plymouth County, Iowa.

Pollution
The Big Sioux is South Dakota's most populated river basin. Agriculture is the primary use of land along most of the river's course. To comply with the Clean Water Act, the state monitors water quality of its rivers. Most of the Big Sioux north of Sioux Falls was scored well in 2012. Portions near Lake Kampeska and between Willow and Stray Horse Creeks (Codington and Hamlin counties) exceeded federally allowable levels of E. coli and fecal coliform bacteria. However, the Big Sioux south of Sioux Falls is much more polluted with E. coli, fecal coliform, and suspended solids. Several portions heavily restrict fishing or human contact, and swimming is banned.

Flood control
Between 1955 and 1961, an extensive flood control system was constructed by the U.S. Army Corps of Engineers along the Big Sioux and some of its tributaries in Sioux Falls to protect the city from a 100-year flood event. Features of the system include  of levees, a floodwall in downtown, and a  diversion channel with a dam at one end and a  spillway at the other. The diversion channel connects two ends of the Big Sioux's natural loop around central Sioux Falls in an effort to channel floodwater away from the city. The levees then act to contain any floodwater either remaining in the natural channel or originating from Skunk Creek (whose mouth is downriver of the diversion dam). Additionally, a greenway covers much of the river's floodplain in southern and eastern Sioux Falls, further mitigating any property damage from high water.

Flooding 
The Big Sioux River experienced record-breaking flooding during the 2019 Midwestern U.S. floods.

The Big Sioux River Flood Information System was used to model flooding during the March 2019 bomb cyclone event.

The river overflowed its banks between September 12–15, 2019, flooding three blocks of Dell Rapids, South Dakota, and damaging up to a dozen homes. Interstate 90 was shut down between Mitchell and Sioux Falls.

See also

Big Sioux Recreation Area
Blood Run Site — Native American Settlement
Floyd River
List of river borders of U.S. states
List of rivers of Iowa
List of rivers of South Dakota
Little Sioux River
Siouxland

References

Further reading

Borders of South Dakota
Borders of Iowa
Geography of Sioux Falls, South Dakota
Rivers of Brookings County, South Dakota
Rivers of Codington County, South Dakota
Rivers of Grant County, South Dakota
Rivers of Hamlin County, South Dakota
Rivers of Lincoln County, South Dakota
Rivers of Lyon County, Iowa
Rivers of Minnehaha County, South Dakota
Rivers of Moody County, South Dakota
Rivers of Plymouth County, Iowa
Rivers of Roberts County, South Dakota
Rivers of Sioux County, Iowa
Rivers of Union County, South Dakota
Mississippi River watershed
Rivers of Iowa
Rivers of South Dakota
Sioux City, Iowa
Tributaries of the Missouri River